Aliabad-e Takht-e Khvajeh (also Romanized as  ‘Alīābād-e Takht-e Khvājeh; also known as Takht-e Khvājeh-ye Pā’īn, Allāhābād, and Allāhābād-e Takht-e Khvājeh is a village in Arzuiyeh Rural District, in the Central District of Arzuiyeh County, Kerman Province, Iran. At the 2006 census, its population was 420, in 99 families.

References 

Populated places in Arzuiyeh County